This is a list of the 21 members of the European Parliament for the Greece in the 2019 to 2024 session.

These MEPs were elected at the 2019 European Parliament election in the Greece.

List 

On the New Democracy list:  (EPP Group)
Stelios Kympouropoulos
Vangelis Meimarakis
Maria Spyraki
Eliza Vozemberg
Manolis Kefalogiannis
Anna Asimakopoulou
Giorgos Kyrtsos
Theodoros Zagorakis

On the Coalition of the Radical Left list: (GUE–NGL)
Dimitrios Papadimoulis
Elena Kountoura
Kostas Arvanitis
Stelios Kouloglou
Alexis Georgoulis
Petros S. Kokkalis

On the Movement for Change list: (S&D)
Nikos Androulakis
Eva Kaili

On the Communist Party of Greece list: (Non-Inscrits)
Konstantinos Papadakis
Lefteris Nikolaou-Alavanos

On the Golden Dawn list: (Non-Inscrits)
Ioannis Lagos (left the party on 13 July 2019)
Athanasios Konstantinou (now independent)

On the Greek Solution list: (ECR)
Kyriakos Velopoulos – until 7 July 2019Emmanouil Fragkos – since 10 July 2019

References

See also 

 List of members of the European Parliament, 2019–2024

Lists of Members of the European Parliament for Greece
Lists of Members of the European Parliament 2019–2024
MEPs for Greece 2019–2024